Samiur Rahman (3 December 1953 – 19 April 2022) was a Bangladeshi cricketer and umpire. He played for Bangladesh in its first-ever One Day International (ODI) game against Pakistan at Moratuwa, Sri Lanka in 1986 Asia Cup. He played in total two ODIs. Apart from being a new ball swing bowler, he was also a useful lower order batsman. Like his brother, Yousuf Rahman (better known as Yousuf Babu), Sami was a regular for the national side in the first half of the 1980s.

Career 
Though Rahman was overlooked for the first ICC Trophy in 1979, he was a vital member of the side that finished fourth in 1982. He took seven wickets at 18.85 a piece. His best bowling, 3/31 came in the first match against West Africa. In 1986, Rahman played in only three matches taking three wickets.

Rahman was a Bangladesh Cricket Board (BCB) umpire of more than one hundred matches and served as a match referee in 25 T20 matches.

Rahman died on 19 April 2022, aged 66. He had been ill for two years having been diagnosed with a brain tumour and suffering from other health complications.

References

1953 births
2022 deaths
Cricketers from Dhaka
Bangladesh One Day International cricketers
Bangladeshi cricketers
Bangladeshi cricket umpires